A stream pool, in hydrology, is a stretch of a river or stream in which the water depth is above average and the water velocity is below average.

Formation 

A stream pool may be bedded with sediment or armoured with gravel, and in some cases the pool formations may have been formed as basins in exposed bedrock formations. Plunge pools, or plunge basins, are stream pools formed by the action of waterfalls. Pools are often formed on the outside of a bend in a meandering river.

Dynamics 
The depth and lack of water velocity often leads to stratification in stream pools, especially in warmer regions. In warm arid regions of the Western United States, surface waters were found to be 3-9 °C higher than those at the bottom

Habitat
This portion of a stream often provides a specialized aquatic ecosystem habitat for organisms that have difficulty feeding or navigating in swifter reaches of the stream or in seasonally warmer water. Such pools can be important for fish habitat, especially where many streams reach high summer temperatures and very low-flow dry season characteristics. In warm and arid regions, the stratification of stream pools provide cooler water for fish that prefer low water temperatures such as the redband trout (Oncorhynchus mykiss) in the Western United States. Mosquito larvae, which prefer still and often stagnant water, can be found in stream pools due to the low water velocity.

See also
 Pond
 Reach (geography)
 Riffle
 Stream gradient
 List of waterfalls by flow rate
 List of waterfalls by type

Notes

External links
 USGS: Stream Modeling website

 
Water streams
Hydrology
Bodies of water